Maria Jesuína Carrilho Bernardo (25 November 1943 – 6 February 2022) was a Portuguese politician.

A member of the Socialist Party, she served in the Assembly of the Republic from 1995 to 1999 and again from 2005 to 2009. She was also a member of the European Parliament from 1999 to 2004.

She died in Lisbon on 6 February 2022, at the age of 78.

References

1943 births
2022 deaths
20th-century Portuguese women politicians
20th-century Portuguese politicians
21st-century Portuguese women politicians
21st-century Portuguese politicians
Socialist Party (Portugal) politicians
Members of the European Parliament for Portugal
MEPs for Portugal 1999–2004
Members of the Assembly of the Republic (Portugal)
Women members of the Assembly of the Republic (Portugal)
People from Beja, Portugal